The men's triple jump event at the 1996 World Junior Championships in Athletics was held in Sydney, Australia, at International Athletic Centre on 23 and 24 August.

Medalists

Results

Final
24 August

Qualifications
23 Aug

Group A

Group B

Participation
According to an unofficial count, 34 athletes from 24 countries participated in the event.

References

Triple jump
Triple jump at the World Athletics U20 Championships